Sammach-e Mahmud (also Romanized as Sammāch-e Maḩmūd; also known as Samāch-e Mollāmaḩmūd) is a village in Negur Rural District, Dashtiari District, Chabahar County, Sistan and Baluchestan Province, Iran. At the 2006 census, its population was 564, in 104 families.

References 

Populated places in Chabahar County